William M. Brown may refer to:
 William M. Brown (Pennsylvania politician) (1850–1915), Republican political official from Pennsylvania
 William Brown (British Columbia politician) (1838– after 1882), English-born political figure in British Columbia
 William M. Brown (businessman), chief executive officer and chairman of L3Harris Technologies
 William Brown (baseball) (1866–1897), Major League Baseball player
 William Montgomery Brown (1855–1937), Episcopal clergyman and author
 William Brown (headmaster) (1914–2005), headmaster of the King's School, Ely, and of Bedford School
 William Mason Brown (1828–1898), American artist